Gangster Blues is a Nepali romantic thriller movie directed by Hem Raj BC. featuring Aashirman DS Joshi and Anna Sharma in lead roles. The film was shot in Nepalgunj and Achham. The film is an action packed love story which revolves around two protagonists Aakash (Aashirman) and Aarzoo (Anna), it shows how in the corrupted world the youth have a lot of reasons to turn into criminals and when you have someone special you love there will be much more consequences that come with it. The movie did good business but received mixed reviews. One of the film's songs, Ajambari went on to become a huge hit with over 20 million views on YouTube till date.

Plot

Aakash after being expelled from his 3rd semester BBA in Kathmandu gets back to his hometown, Nepalgunj. Getting back to hometown turns out to be a beautiful event for him when he finds his school life crush Aarzoo who is a Medical student at Nepalgunj Medical College. Aarzoo has a past; her mother committed suicide when she was young which is why she is repelled by violence. Aakash starts working for local Gang for easy money to impress Aarzoo but she is not aware of this. They fall for each other gradually. As time goes by their relationship as well as Aakash's involvement in the gang grows,
turning him into Gangster. Aakash gets into street fight that drags him in the jail. Further dragging him into murder charge. Aarzoo feels repelled and cheated when Aakash is exposed to his doings and leaves him. How they move forward and deal with the consequences they face is “Gangster Blues”.

Cast
Aashirman DS Joshi as Aakash
Anna Sharma as Aarzoo
Samyam Puri as Kallu
Rojisha Shahi as Tara
Aruna Karki as Aakash's mother
Ram Babu Gurung as DSP
Pramod Agrahari as Afzal

Soundtrack

See also
 Aashirman DS Joshi
 Anna Sharma
 Rojisha Shahi
 Ram Babu Gurung
 Kali Prasad Baskota
 Melina Rai

References

External links

2010s Nepali-language films
2017 films
2010s romantic thriller films
2017 crime drama films
2017 action drama films
2017 thriller drama films
2017 romantic drama films
2010s teen drama films
Nepalese gangster films